The 2005 JPMorgan Chase Open was a women's tennis tournament played on outdoor hard courts. It was part of the Tier II Series of the 2005 WTA Tour. It was the 32nd edition of the tournament and took place in Carson, California, United States, from August 8 through August 14, 2005. Fifth-seeded Kim Clijsters won the singles title, her second at the event after 2003, and earned $93,000 first-prize money.

Finals

Singles

 Kim Clijsters defeated  Daniela Hantuchová, 6–4, 6–1
 It was Clijsters' 5th singles title of the year and the 26th of her career.

Doubles

 Elena Dementieva /  Flavia Pennetta defeated  Angela Haynes /  Bethanie Mattek, 6–2, 6–4

References

External links
 ITF tournament edition details
 Tournament draws

2005 WTA Tour
LA Women's Tennis Championships
2005 US Open Series